Catherine Kotromanić Babonić (? – after 1310) was Princess of Bosnia and Baness of Slavonia by marriage.

Catherine was child of Prijezda I Kotromanić and his wife Elizabeth of Slavonia. Her brothers were Vuk, Prijezda and Stephen. Catherine was married to Stpehen III Babonić. They had two sons: 
 Ladislav (fl. 1293)
 Stephen V (fl. 1293)
Catherine and her husband were given Zemunik Fortress in Vrbas area by Prijezda I in spring 1287. Catherine was Baness of Slavonia from 1310 to 1316.

References

Croatian nobility
Kotromanić dynasty